Mercedes-Benz has sold a number of automobiles with the "220" model name:
 1951–1955 W187
 1951–1955 220
 1954–1959 W180
 1954–1956 220a
 1956–1959 220S
 1958–1960 W128
 1958–1960 220SE
 1959–1965 W111
 1959–1965 220b
 1959–1965 220Sb
 1959–1965 220SEb
 1968–1973 W115
 1968–1973 220
 1968–1973 220D
 1994–1997 W202
 1994–1997 C220

220